The 2018–19 UAE League Cup or 2018–19 Arabian Gulf Cup for sponsorship reasons, was the 11th season of the UAE League Cup.

Al Wahda were the defending champions, after defeating Al Wasl 2–1 in the finals of 2017–18 edition.

Shabab Al Ahli won their fourth UAE League Cup, first since renaming to their current name after defeating the defending champions, Al Wahda 3–1 in the finals in the extra-time.

Group stage

Group A

Group B

Knockout stage

Quarter-finals

Semi-finals

Finals

Statistics

Top goalscorers

Source:

References

External links
Arabian Gulf Cup official website

UAE League Cup seasons
2018–19 Asian domestic association football cups